The Watumull Institute of Electronics  Engineering and  Computer  Technology is an engineering college in Ulhasnagar, Thane District. It has been approved by the All India Council for Technical Education (AICTE).

WIEECT was established in 1980 as postgraduate three years integrated engineering diploma which later converted to degree B.Sc.(Tech) for B.Sc (Physics/Maths/Electronics) students.  Since 1984 this institute produced excellent technocrats who created WIEECT's identity in top notch industries in India and abroad.

From year 2002 onwards WIEECT offers a four-year bachelor of engineering courses in Computer, Electronics & Telecommunication, Bio-medical and Instrumentation streams. Its active student community hosts branches of several professional societies including IEEE, CSI, IETE, ISA etc.

Watumull Institute is the only engineering college in Ulhasnagar.

Getting Admission
Students can join the college for the First Engineering (F.E.) batch, based on the following two criteria,a) Their score in the MHT-CET (for Maharashtra students)b) Their score in the JEE Mains (for others). Watumull also has SE admission for diploma holders (D.E.).

Faculty
The present Principal of the Institute is Dr. Sunita Sharma.

Infrastructure

Building
The Watumull Institute functions from a single eight-storey building, which is currently undergoing renovation and plans are afoot to add another two floors to the building for additional laboratories and other facilities.
The building is now a part of CHM campus, Ulhasnagar.

Sports
The college has no open grounds. However, it does have facilities for playing Table Tennis, football, cricket, chess, and carrom. Additionally, there are Police grounds which are a 10-minute walking distance from the college where one can play cricket and football and also has nets for playing volleyball. The intra-college sporting events are usually conducted here and at oval stadium Churchgate.

Library
The Watumull library provides a vast collection of books and periodicals, which include university prescribed textbooks and reference material. The library subscribes to all major technical journals and magazines and some major non-technical magazines as well. The library has recently been digitally cataloged, thereby making it simpler to locate a book. Apart from books, the college also has thousands of CDs and DVDs pertaining to engineering.

Laboratories

Electronics and Telecommunication
The Electronics & Telecommunication Department comprises  8 Laboratories -
 Electronics Lab
 Digital & Microprocessor
 Communication
 Image processing
 Microwave & Fibre optics
 Digital Signal processing
 Industrial Electronics
 Basic Electrical & Electronics

All the Laboratories are well equipped with the Advanced Experiment Set-ups as required by the university. 
Software's such as OrCAD & MATLAB, Circuit maker, PSPICE, LINUX, all analog & digital electronics equipment & components, electrical machines, electronic & digital communication apparatus, antenna-based experiments, etc. are provided by the college labs.

Computer
The Computer Department comprises 4 Laboratories  (named lab1,2,4,4)
 Hardware Laboratory
 Graphics Laboratory
 Design Laboratory
 Programming Laboratory

All the laboratories are fully equipped with Sun machines, P4 machines, Local Area Network, Internet connection. Using OS like SUSE Linux 10.0, Solaris 10, Windows XP and now Windows Vista.

Software packages like Oracle 10g, OpenGL, Java, XML, Rational Rose etc. are available to the students. The computers are all strictly firewalled and monitored to prevent anti-social activities. 
pirated versions

Biomedical
Biomedical Department has relevant systems based on Biomedical Engineering. These are for educational purposes and although actual models have not been in practical use for obvious reasons.
 Surgical diathermy  machine 
 pH meter 
 Haemometer 
 Defibrillator

Instrumentation
Instrumentation Department has relevant systems based on process measurement and control line 
 Flow process trainer
 Festo pneumatic trainer
 Simulation Software for hydraulic, pneumatic system
 Microprocessor trainer kits
 Microcontroller trainer kits
 Heat exchanger systems
 PID controllers and trainers
 LVDT trainers
 Sensors of different types like loadcell, strain gauge, Temperative sensors, pressure sensor etc.
The Instrumentation Laboratories are well equipped with computers also.

Auditorium
A fully functional, fully revamped auditorium at the ground floor adds to the campus.

Societies
Here are a few of the societies in Watumull:
 RSW (Robotics Society of Watumull)
 WSAC (Watumull's Students Activities Cell)

Festival
Watumull holds an annual festival, ENSEMBLE, which highlights the achievements of the college and its students. It is generally held after the conclusion of the first term of the year. It consists of events like rappelling, wall-climbing, robotics, a virtual stock exchange, mock detective games, treasure hunts, base games, crystal mazes and various personality contests.

References

External links
Official site

Engineering colleges in Mumbai